Tecoh is a town and the municipal seat of the Tecoh Municipality, Yucatán in Mexico.

References

Populated places in Yucatán